Chaas was a town of Triphylia, in ancient Elis, nor far from Lepreum on the Akidas. Strabo comments that some people believed that Chaas was the location of the war between Pylos and the Arcadians, as told by Homer.

It is unlocated.

References

Populated places in ancient Elis
Former populated places in Greece
Lost ancient cities and towns